Masters of Anima is a real-time strategy video game developed by French studio Passtech Games.

Plot 
The plot follows Otto, a newly inducted member of a guild of magicians known as "shapers". The shapers' guild is attacked by the nefarious Zahr, who uses forbidden magics to kidnap the prime shaper, Ana. Otto must use the magic of the shapers to rescue Ana so that she can restore the world to its proper order.

Gameplay 
During gameplay, the player must control Otto and use his shaping magic to summon arbitrary combinations of 5 "guardians": Protectors, Sentinels, Keepers, Commanders, and Summoners. While Otto himself is controlled in a traditional third-person style, players must control the units indirectly through Otto by selecting them and issuing various commands (e.g., Attack, Move). Gameplay alternates between two primary modes: an exploration mode where the player's main focus is environment navigation and solving puzzles, and combat arenas where the player is locked into a specific space until they have defeated various hostile golems. Otto himself can directly affect the game, whether through attacking with his staff, activating special abilities for the units he has summoned, or activating puzzle elements. Story progression is broken up into discrete levels that progress linearly.

Reception 

Masters of Anima received generally positive reviews.

See also
Pikmin
Overlord

References

External links
 

Nintendo Switch games
2018 video games
PlayStation 4 games
Single-player video games
Focus Entertainment games
Real-time tactics video games
Video games about shapeshifting
Video games about witchcraft
Video games developed in France
Windows games
Xbox One games